Euxoa hastifera is a moth of the family Noctuidae. It is found from southern Europe to Siberia and Tajikistan.

Description
Warren states E. hastifera Donz. (5h). Forewing purplish fuscous; costa broadly pale ochreous to outer line; cell blackish; stigmata outlined with black; orbicular and reniform with brown centres and ochreous rings, the former round: hindwing white, with grey margin. S. Europe, France, Austria, S. Russia, Transylvania:West Asia, Armenia, Asia Minor, Persia and the Altai Mts.

Subspecies
Euxoa hastifera hastifera
Euxoa hastifera pomazensis (Hungary)
Euxoa hastifera abdallah (Portugal, Spain, Morocco)
Euxoa hastifera geghardica (Armenia)

References

External links
Fauna Europaea
Neue Noctuiden aus der Sammlung Vartian (wien), II. (Lepidoptera, Noctuidae) - Description of Euxoa hastifera geghardica

Euxoa
Moths of Europe
Moths of Asia
Taxa named by Hugo Fleury Donzel
Moths described in 1848